The Marble Bridge, formally known as the Fletcher D. Proctor Memorial Bridge, carries Main Street across Otter Creek in the center of Proctor, Vermont.  Built in 1915 and widened in 1935-36, it is a well-preserved example of early concrete bridge construction, and is decoratively faced in local marble.  The bridge was listed on the National Register of Historic Places in 1991.

Description and history
The Marble Bridge is one of a few bridges crossing Otter Creek in Proctor. It connects the village center on the west side of the creek, with mainly residential areas to the east, and provides access to United States Route 7, which runs north-south further to the east. The arches are mounted on battered concrete piers, and the spandrels are faced in locally quarried gray marble. The sides of the bridge are adorned with marble balustrades.

The bridge was built in 1915 to a design by Harry Leslie Walker of New York City, and was originally a single lane wide.  The 1910s were the first period in Vermont when concrete began to be used as a building material for bridges (supplanting the wooden covered bridges which were predominant prior to this because of a erroneous belief that concrete and metal would last longer and require less maintenance). It is one of the few concrete bridges in the state to survive from this early period.  It was widened in 1935-36 with funding from the Works Progress Administration.  It is dedicated to Fletcher D. Proctor, who headed the family-owned Vermont Marble Company and served as Governor of Vermont.  The bridge is a major marble landmark in the community, whose livelihood has depended on the stone for many years.

See also
National Register of Historic Places listings in Rutland County, Vermont
List of bridges on the National Register of Historic Places in Vermont

References

Road bridges on the National Register of Historic Places in Vermont
Bridges completed in 1915
Bridges in Rutland County, Vermont
Buildings and structures in Proctor, Vermont
National Register of Historic Places in Rutland County, Vermont
Arch bridges in the United States
Concrete bridges in the United States